Geoff Walker may refer to:

Geoff Walker (footballer) (1926–1997), English professional footballer 
Geoff Walker (canoeist) (1952–1997), New Zealand canoeist who competed at the 1980 Summer Olympics
Geoff Walker (curler) (born 1985), Canadian curler 
Geoff Walker (ice hockey) (born 1987), Canadian ice hockey player

See also
Jeff Walker (disambiguation)